Blue Creek is a stream in White County, Georgia. It is a tributary of the Chattahoochee River.

Course

Blue Creek rises in central White County, Georgia, just northeast of Cleveland and just east of State Route 75. The creek runs south and southeast until it crosses State Route 255, then turns northeast and back to the east, before flowing into the Chattahoochee River less than 1 mile south of the confluence of Amys Creek and the Chattahoochee.

Sub-watershed details
The creek watershed is designated by the United States Geological Survey as sub-watershed HUC 031300010106, is named Blue Creek-Chattahoochee River sub-watershed, and drains an area of approximately 30 square miles east of Cleveland, and west of the Chattahoochee River.

See also
 South Atlantic-Gulf Water Resource Region
 Apalachicola basin

References 

Blue Creek (Chattahoochee River)
Rivers of White County, Georgia